In linguistics, telicity is the property of a verb or verb phrase that presents an action or event as having a specific endpoint. A verb or verb phrase with this property is said to be telic; if the situation it describes is not heading for any particular endpoint, it is said to be atelic.

Testing for telicity in English 
One common way to gauge whether an English verb phrase is telic is to see whether such a phrase as in an hour, in the sense of "within an hour", (known as a time-frame adverbial) can be applied to it. Conversely, a common way to gauge whether the phrase is atelic is to see whether such a phrase as for an hour (a time-span adverbial) can be applied to it. This can be called the time-span/time-frame test. According to this test, the verb phrase built a house is telic, whereas the minimally different built houses is atelic:

 Fine: "John built a house in a month."
 Bad: *"John built a house for a month."
 → built a house is telic
 Bad: *"John built houses in a month."
 Fine: "John built houses for a month."
 → built houses is atelic

Other phrases can be tested similarly; for example, walked home is telic, because "John walked home in an hour" is fine, while "John walked home for an hour" is bad, whereas walked around is atelic, because "John walked around in an hour" is bad, while "John walked around for an hour" is fine.

In applying this test, one must be careful about a number of things.
 The tense and aspect of a verb may affect the result of this test; for example, phrases with progressive verb forms (is going, was talking, has been doing, and so on) almost always accept for an hour and almost never accept in an hour. The test is therefore primarily of interest for verb phrases with verbs in the simple past tense.
 The phrase in an hour, and phrases like it, are ambiguous; they can mean either "in the span of an hour", i.e. "within an hour", or "one hour from now". Only the former meaning is of interest; "She will be coming in an hour" is fine, but that says nothing about the telicity of the phrase will be coming.
 Strictly speaking, there is a context in which "John built houses in a month" is fine; consider "Jack took three months to build a house, while John built houses in a month." Here, what is meant is "John built houses; he built each house in a month"; and in this sense, built houses is actually telic. It can be argued that the verb phrase "build houses" is, in fact, telic at one level and atelic at another: the telicity applies to the verb without the plural object, and the atelicity applies to the verb and the object together.
There is also a context in which "John built a house for a month" can be considered grammatical. It implies that after one month John gave up and left the project unfinished. There is no change in telicity, because the "building" is still over and John will not return to the unfinished project.

Defining the relevant notion of "completeness"

Having endpoints 
One often encounters the notion that telic verbs and verb phrases refer to events that have endpoints, and that atelic ones refer to events or states that don't have endpoints. The notion of having endpoints applies to events in the world rather than the expressions that refer to them. This is the most criticized property of this definition. In fact, every event or state in the world begins and ends at some point, except, perhaps, for states that can be described as "the existence of the universe."  Certainly, John's being angry has a beginning, and, unless John is somehow eternally angry, it also has an endpoint. Thus, it is doubtful that one can define telic expressions by means of properties of the events or states that they refer to (a very similar problem arises with the notion that mass nouns refer to things that can't be counted).   Thus, recent attempts at making the notion explicit focus on the way that telic expressions refer to, or present events or states.

Put differently,  one can simply define telic verbs and verb phrases as referring to events conceptualized or presented as having endpoints, and atelic verbs and verb phrases as those conceptualized or presented as lacking endpoints.

This type of exercise can serve as a reminder of the futility of trying to link linguistic semantics to the real world without considering the intermediary agent of human cognition.

Tending towards a goal 
According to Garey (1957), who introduced the term "telic",
telic verbs are verbs expressing an action tending towards a goal envisaged as realized in a perfective tense, but as contingent in an imperfective tense; atelic verbs, on the other hand, are verbs which do not involve any goal nor endpoint in their semantic structure, but denote actions that are realized as soon as they begin.

Quantization and cumulativity 
Perhaps the most commonly assumed definition of telicity nowadays is the algebraic definition proposed by Manfred Krifka. Krifka defines telic expressions as ones that are quantized. Atelic ones can be defined in terms of cumulative reference.   An expression 'P' can be said to be quantized if and only if it satisfies the following implication, for any choice of x and y:
 If x can be described by 'P', and y can also be described by 'P', then x is not a (mereological) proper part of y.
Suppose, for example, that John built two houses. Then each of the two building events can be described as built a house. But the building of the one house isn't, and indeed cannot be thought of a proper part of the building of the second.  This contrasts with states describable as, say, walk around aimlessly.  If John walked around aimlessly for two hours, then there will be many proper parts of that, that last, say 10 minutes, or 1 hour, etc. which also can be described as walk around aimlessly.  Thus, for walk around aimlessly, there will be many choices of x and y, such that both can be described as walk around aimlessly, where x is a proper part of y. Hence, build a house is correctly characterized as telic and walk around aimlessly as atelic by this  definition.  Quantization can also be used in the definition of count nouns.

An expression 'P' is said to have cumulative reference if and only if, for any choice of x and y, the following implication holds:
 If x can be described as 'P', and y can also be described as 'P', then the mereological sum of x and y can also be described as 'P'.
For example, if there is an event of John walking around from 1pm to 2pm, and another event of his walking around from 2pm to 3pm, then there is, by necessity, a third event which is the sum of the other two, which is also an event of walking around.  This doesn't hold for expressions like "built a house." If John built a house from time 1 to time 2, and then he built another house from time 2 to time 3, then the sum of these two events (from time 1 to time 3) is not an event that can be described by "built a house." Cumulativity can also be used in the characterization of mass nouns, and in the characterization of the contrast between prepositions like "to" and "towards,"  i.e. "towards" has cumulative reference to (sets of) paths, while "to" does not.

As an aspect 

Telicity or telic aspect has been read as a grammatical aspect lately, indicating a reached goal or action completed as intended. Languages that contrast telic and atelic actions are Pirahã and Finnic languages such as Finnish and Estonian; Czech and Hungarian also have perfective prefixes pre- and meg-, respectively, which are additionally telic.

In Finnish, the telicity is mandatorily marked on the object: the accusative is telic, and the partitive is used to express atelicity. More accurately, the accusative case is used of objects that are completely affected by the situation as presented by the speaker, whereas using partitive implies that the object is only partially affected in the situation or that the situation is framed so that the object continues to be affected outside it. The terms telic and atelic are not traditionally used in Finnish grammatical description; instead, it is customary to speak of resultative and irresultative sentences.

An example of the contrast between resultative and irresultative in Finnish:

The telic sentence necessarily requires finishing the article. In the atelic sentence, it is not expressed whether or not the article is finished. The atelic form expresses ignorance, i.e. atelic is not anti-telic: Kirjoitin artikkelia ja sain sen valmiiksi "I was writing the article-PART and then got it-ACC finished" is correct. What is interpreted as the goal or result is determined by the context, e.g.
 Ammuin karhun – "I shot the bear (succeeded)"; i.e., "I shot the bear dead". ← implicit purpose
 Ammuin karhua – "I shot (towards) the bear"; i.e., "I shot at the bear (but it did not die)".

There are many verbs that correspond to only one telicity due to their inherent meaning. The partitive verbs roughly correspond with atelic verbs in Garey's definition, that is, the action normally does not have a result or goal, and it would be logically and grammatically incorrect to place them in the telic aspect. However, even inherently atelic verbs such as rakastaa "to love" can in semantically unusual constructions, where a kind of result is involved, become telic:

Also, many other stative verbs that are in terms of their meaning inherently atelic, mark their objects in the accusative case, which is the normal case for telic situations:

Furthermore, the telicity contrast can act as case government, so that changing the case can change the meaning entirely. For example, näin hänet (I saw him-ACC) means "I saw him", but näin häntä (I saw him-PART) means "I met him (occasionally, sometimes, every now and then)". This is often highly irregular.

The use of a telic object may implicitly communicate that the action takes place in the future. For example,
 Luen kirjan. "I will read the book"; the action can only be complete in the future.
 Luen kirjaa. "I am reading a book" or "I will be reading a book"; no indication is given for the time.

Often telicity is superficially similar to the perfective aspect, and one can find descriptions such as "roughly perfective–imperfective". However, lexical pairs of perfective and imperfective verbs are found in Finnish, and this contrast can be superimposed with the telicity contrast.

References

External links 
Krifka, Manfred, "Origins of Telicity".  Also in Events and Grammar, Susan Rothstein (ed.), 1998, pp. 197–236

Grammar
Formal semantics (natural language)
Syntax–semantics interface